or  ('pallamaglio' in Italian, Middle French for 'mallet game', or sometimes interpreted as 'straw game') is an ancient outdoor game, originally from Naples, which gave rise to numerous modern sports, such as golf, croquet, hockey and its variations, and polo. It is a now-obsolete lawn game originating in the Late Middle Ages and mostly played in the Kingdom of Naples and France, surviving in some locales into the 20th century. It is a form of ground billiards, using one or more balls, a stick with a mallet-like head, and usually featuring one or more targets such as hoops or holes.  was ancestral to the games golf, palle-malle and croquet, and (by moving it indoors and playing on a table with smaller equipment), billiards.

History
One of the oldest references to the game of 'pallamaglio', and to its Neapolitan origin, is by Anton Francesco Grazzini, also known as Lasca. The game is also mentioned in a list of Neapolitan popular games in Giordano Bruno's comedy The Candlestick (1582). The game was probably already played in the Kingdom of Naples in the twelfth century. The  in the name probably means 'maul, mallet', from Latin . An alternative meaning of 'straw' has been suggested (Modern French ), on the basis that the target hoops used in some versions of the game were sometimes made of bound straw.

Quite popular in various forms in the Kingdom of Naples, then in other parts of Italy and France in the Late Middle Ages and Renaissance, the game developed into pall-mall in the early modern period, which spread to Scotland then England; this, in turn, eventually led to croquet.

The game was still played in France, in the areas of Montpellier and Aix-en-Provence, into the early 20th century, before the First World War. An educational institution in Montpellier, Collège Jeu de Mail, still bears the name of this game.

Game play
The game makes use of one or more balls that are generally of boxwood, but higher-quality balls are of medlar. The ball is struck with a long stick with a mallet- or foot-like end, similar to a croquet mallet or golf club, respectively; it is essentially a heavy version of the billiard  (which eventually developed into the cue stick). Different variants of the game may have differing goals or targets (if any), ranging from croquet-like hoops to golf-like holes in the ground. There are four known named rules variations of the game:

  ('quarrel', 'quibble') – similar to golf; the winner is the one who reaches a distant goal in the fewest strokes.
  ('great blow') – the goal is to launch the ball as far as possible; good players might exceed 
  ('wheel',) – played with several balls; ancestral to croquet and billiards
  ('party') – a team version.

References

Ground billiards
Sports originating in France